UFC 29: Defense of the Belts was a mixed martial arts event held by the Ultimate Fighting Championship on December 16, 2000 at Differ Ariake Arena in Kōtō ward, Tokyo, Japan.

History
The event was the last UFC to be held in Japan until the UFC visited the country again during UFC 144, and the last event to be promoted by "UFC-J", the UFC's Japanese counterpart. As the name implies, the card featured two title defenses, featuring Light Heavyweight Champion Tito Ortiz, and Lightweight Champion Pat Miletich.

UFC 29 is notable for featuring one of the few UFC losses by future longtime Welterweight Champion Matt Hughes, who was submitted in just 20 seconds by Dennis Hallman. The event also featured the first televised UFC appearance of Olympic silver medalist Matt Lindland. It was also the first UFC card to have music played in between rounds, and a different theme than the standard UFC entrance theme. A local ring announcer was used instead of the usual Bruce Buffer.

UFC 29 was broadcast in Japan on January 7, 2001, well after the event, by the Japanese satellite television channel Sky Sports, now known as J Sports.

UFC 29 was the seventh straight UFC event to have never seen a home video or DVD release, as their parent company SEG was nearing bankruptcy. UFC 29 was the last UFC event held by SEG, and following UFC 29, in January 2001, SEG sold the UFC to new owners Zuffa LLC.

Results

See also 
 Ultimate Fighting Championship
 List of UFC champions
 List of UFC events
 2000 in UFC

External links
 Official UFC website
 UFC 29 fights reviews

References

Ultimate Fighting Championship events
2000 in mixed martial arts
Mixed martial arts in Japan
Sports competitions in Tokyo
2000 in Japanese sport